Wine cake, known in Spanish as torta envinada, is a cake made with wine in Colombian cuisine. Torta negra Colombiana (Colombian black cake) and Bizcocho Negro are similar cakes with varying ingredients (raisins, candied fruit, and rum).

See also
Rum cake

References

Cakes
Colombian cuisine
Wine dishes